Mount Lola is a mountain in the Sierra Nevada of California. It is also the highest point in the Sierra Nevada north of Interstate 80.

The area receives copious snowfall during the winter because of its high elevation.

The Mount Lola is named for Lola Montez, a famous resident of Nevada County, who lived in Grass Valley in the 1850s.

See also
 List of highest points in California by county

References

External links
 

Mountains of the Sierra Nevada (United States)
Mountains of Nevada County, California
Mountains of Sierra County, California
Mountains of Northern California